This list of language-related awards is an index to articles on notable awards given for language-related work.

List

See also

 Word of the year
 Lists of awards
 List of writing awards
 List of literary awards

References

 
language
Awards